Leccinum alaskanum is a species of bolete fungus in the family Boletaceae. Found in Alaska, it was described as new to science in 1975.

References

Fungi described in 1975
Fungi of the United States
alaskanum